Neoclytus leucozonus is a beetle in the family Cerambycidae. It is native to continental United States and Canada.

References 

Neoclytus
Beetles described in 1835